6-Amino-5-nitropyridin-2-one or 6-amino-5-nitro-2(1H)-pyridinone is a pyridine base.  It is used as a nucleobase of hachimoji DNA, in which it pairs with 5-aza-7-deazaguanine.

References

Nucleobases
2-Pyridones
Nitro compounds
Amines